The 1982 Nippon Professional Baseball season was the 33rd season of operation for the league.

Regular season standings

Central League

Pacific League

Pacific League Playoff
The Pacific League teams with the best first and second-half records met in a best-of-five playoff series to determine the league representative in the Japan Series.

Seibu Lions won the series 3–1.

Japan Series

Seibu Lions won the series 4–2.

See also
1982 Major League Baseball season

References

1982 in baseball
1982 in Japanese sport